A blazer is an item of clothing.

Blazer or blazers may also refer to:

People 
 Blazer (surname)
 Blazer (given name):
 Ashley Blazer Biden (born 1981), American social worker, activist, philanthropist, and fashion designer
 Owen Hart (1965–1999), Canadian professional wrestler nicknamed The Blue Blazer
 Takuya Sugi (born 1983), Japanese professional wrestler known as El Blazer

Sports teams
 Barisal Blazers, a T20 franchise team in Bangladesh NCL T20
 Benilde Blazers, varsity teams of De La Salle-College of Saint Benilde, the Philippines
 Boston Blazers, a professional indoor lacrosse team in Boston, Massachusetts, USA
 Boston Blazers (1992–1997)
 Boulevard Blazers, a Bermudan soccer team 
 Buffalo Blazers, a disbanded soccer team that played in New York, USA
 Saint Benedict Blazers, the athletic teams representing the College of Saint Benedict in St. Joseph, Minnesota, USA
 Hood College Blazers, an athletics team at Hood College, Frederick, Maryland, USA
 Kamloops Blazers, a junior hockey team in the Canadian Western Hockey League
 Lloydminster Bobcats, previously known as the Lloydminster Blazers, a Canadian ice hockey team
 New England Blazers, a disbanded US lacrosse team
 Oklahoma City Blazers (1965–77), a defunct professional ice hockey team that played from 1965 to 1977
 Oklahoma City Blazers, a professional ice hockey team in the US Central Hockey League
 Osaka Blazers Sakai, men's volleyball team based in Sakai, Osaka, Japan
 Philadelphia Blazers, ice hockey franchise in the US World Hockey Association
 Portland Trail Blazers, a professional basketball team in the US National Basketball Association
 Quakertown Blazers, a baseball team in the US Atlantic Collegiate Baseball League
 Sackville Blazers, an ice hockey team from Nova Scotia, Canada
 San Antonio Wings, previously known as the Florida Blazers, a US World Football League team 
 Saskatoon Blazers, a Canadian Midget AAA ice hockey team
 Surrey Eagles, previously known as the Bellingham Blazers, an ice hockey team in Surrey, British Columbia, Canada
 Syracuse Blazers, a disbanded minor league hockey team that played in New York, USA
 The Highlands School Blazers, an athletics team in Texas, USA
 UAB Blazers, the intercollegiate athletic program of the University of Alabama at Birmingham, Alabama, USA
 UAB Blazers football
 UAB Blazers men's basketball
 Valdosta State Blazers, the intercollegiate athletic program of Valdosta State University in Georgia, USA
 Valdosta State Blazers football
 Vancouver Blazers, ice hockey franchise in the US World Hockey Association
 West Virginia Blazers, a basketball team in the American Basketball Association

Other uses
 Blazer, former incarnation of the Irish 1980s post-punk band Cruella de Ville
 Blazer 23, a Canadian sailboat design
 Blazer (EP), a 2008 EP by Kavinsky
 Blazer (video game), a 1987 Japanese arcade game by Namco
 Blazer (web browser), an internet web browser
 Blazer horse, a breed of horse
 Chevrolet Blazer (disambiguation), several kinds of sports utility vehicle (SUV)
 Blue Blazer cocktail
 HMS Blazer (P279), a British naval vessel
 Nike Blazers, a shoe
 Texas Blazers, an honorary service organization at The University of Texas, Austin

See also
 Blazar, a type of quasar
 Blazor, a web framework
 Trailblazer (disambiguation)
 Brazier (disambiguation)